The 1980 FINA Women's Water Polo World Cup was the second edition of the event, organised by the world's governing body in aquatics, the International Swimming Federation (FINA). The event took place in Breda, Netherlands, from July 11 to July 13, 1980. The five participating teams, including the Dutch youth team (out-of-competition), played a round robin to decide the winner of the event.

Results Matrix

Final standings

Final ranking

References

1980
International water polo competitions hosted by the Netherlands
Women's water polo in the Netherlands
Women's Water Polo World Cup
World Cup
July 1980 sports events in Europe
Sports competitions in Breda